As a nickname, Guitar may refer to:

 Guitar Gable (1937–2017), American Louisiana blues, swamp blues and swamp pop musician
 Guitar Gabriel (1925–1996), American blues musician whose unique style has been referred to as "Toot Blues"
 Guitar Nubbit (1923–1995), American blues guitarist and singer most notable for "Georgia Chain Gang"
 Guitar Shorty (born 1939), American blues guitarist, singer and songwriter known for his style and stage antics
 Guitar Slim (1926–1959), American blues guitarist in the 1940s and 1950s, best known for the million-selling song "The Things That I Used to Do"
 Guitar Slim, Jr. (born 1952), American New Orleans blues guitarist and singer
 Johnny "Guitar" Watson (1935–1996), American blues / funk guitarist, best known for chart single "A Real Mutha for Ya".

See also 

Lists of people by nickname
Nicknames in music